Aulikki is a Finnish female given name. Notable people with the name include:

 Aulikki Rautawaara (1906–1990), Finnish soprano
 Aulikki Ristoja (born 1949), Finnish chess player

Finnish feminine given names